Limibacter armeniacum is a Gram-negative, strictly aerobic and rod-shaped bacterium from the genus of Limibacter which has been isolated from marine sediments from the Carp Island from Palau.

References

External links
Type strain of Limibacter armeniacum at BacDive -  the Bacterial Diversity Metadatabase	

Sphingobacteriia
Bacteria described in 2008